Oreosaurus achlyens is a species of lizard in the family Gymnophthalmidae. It is endemic to Venezuela.

References

Oreosaurus
Reptiles of Venezuela
Endemic fauna of Venezuela
Reptiles described in 1958
Taxa named by Thomas Marshall Uzzell, Jr.
Taxobox binomials not recognized by IUCN